Section 51(xxxviii) of the Constitution of Australia was intended to give the states of Australia independence from the UK Parliament, as it authorised the Commonwealth Parliament to, with the consent of the relevant state parliament(s), do anything the UK Parliament could do on their behalf, including repeal British laws that applied to them.:164

Despite this, the Commonwealth itself remained subject to Imperial laws of paramount force,:165 until it finally evolved full legislative independence from the UK with the passage of the Statute of Westminster Adoption Act 1942.:167

Reference list

Australian constitutional law